Roberto Maestas (July 9, 1938 - September 22, 2010) was an American social activist who was prominent between the 1960s and the 1990s in Seattle, Washington. Maestas was a member of the Gang of Four and one of the founders of El Centro de la Raza.

Biography
Maestas was born in rural New Mexico and raised by his grandparents and after working throughout the Western United States as a migrant worker eventually settled in Seattle in the 1950s. Maestas was a high school teacher at Franklin High School and then enrolled in a graduate degree program at the University of Washington in 1968. In the early 1970s he helped begin an ESL program at South Seattle College. In 1972, funding to the program was abruptly cut off which led to Maestas and a number of other activists to occupy an abandoned school building in Seattle's Beacon Hill neighborhood which eventually became El Centro de la Raza.

Legacy
On April 25, 2011, the Seattle City Council voted unanimously to rename the segment of South Lander Street between 16th Avenue South and 17th Avenue South (immediately south of El Centro de la Raza) as South Roberto Maestas Festival Street.

References

1938 births
Activists for Hispanic and Latino American civil rights
Activists from Seattle
2010 deaths
Deaths from lung cancer